Elston Ridgle (born August 24, 1963) is a former American football defensive end. He played for the San Francisco 49ers in 1987, the Buffalo Bills and Seattle Seahawks in 1989, the Phoenix Cardinals in 1990 and the Cincinnati Bengals in 1992.

References

1963 births
Living people
American football defensive ends
Northern Arizona Lumberjacks football players
Nevada Wolf Pack football players
San Francisco 49ers players
Buffalo Bills players
Seattle Seahawks players
Phoenix Cardinals players
Green Bay Packers players
Cincinnati Bengals players
Players of American football from Los Angeles
National Football League replacement players